Battle of Britain II: Wings of Victory is a Windows-based flight simulation created by Shockwave Productions, Inc. (currently known as A2A Simulations) and released in 2005. It is a World War II flight simulator.

Gameplay
Battle of Britain II can be played either as a flight simulator or as a strategy game, or both combined.  The player assumes the role of pilot or a commander of the British RAF or the German Luftwaffe in Battle of Britain during Second World War in northern France and southern Britain.

Reception
The game was met with generally favorable reviews, holding a score of 75 out of 100 on the review aggregate site website Metacritic. Though receiving favorable reviews, several reviewers including IGN and Eurogamer cited technical issues such as bugs along with performance problems.

References

External links
A2A Simulations Website (Formerly known as Shockwave Productions, Inc.)

2005 video games
Video games developed in the United States
World War II flight simulation video games
Windows games
Windows-only games
Battle of Britain
Video games set in France
Video games set in the United Kingdom
Tri Synergy games
Single-player video games